The Atlantic Blockading Squadron was a unit of the United States Navy created in the early days of the American Civil War to enforce the Union blockade of the ports of the Confederate States. It was formed in 1861 and split up the same year for the creation of the North Atlantic Blockading Squadron and the South Atlantic Blockading Squadron.

History

American Civil War

Following President Abraham Lincoln’s proclamation of a blockade of Southern ports on April 19, 1861, the Navy Department found it necessary to subdivide the territory assigned to the Home Squadron. This resulted in the creation of the Coast Blockading Squadron and the Gulf Blockading Squadron in early May 1861.

In orders sent on May 1, 1861 Secretary of the Navy Gideon Welles appointed Flag Officer Silas H. Stringham to command the Coast Blockading Squadron. Stringham received this order and took command on May 4, 1861. His new command was to be headquartered at Hampton Roads, Virginia, and was given responsibility for the blockading of the coast from the capes of the Chesapeake to the southern extremity of Florida and Key West. On May 17, 1861, the Coast Blockading Squadron was re-designated the Atlantic Blockading Squadron.

On September 16, 1861, Stringham tendered his resignation as commander of the squadron following his receipt of a letter from Acting Secretary of the Navy Gustavus V. Fox that he felt indicated disapproval of his measures to enforce the blockade. Stringham’s resignation was accepted on September 18, 1861, and the same day Flag Officer Louis M. Goldsborough was appointed as his replacement. The transfer of command took place on September 23, 1861, when Goldsborough arrived at Hampton Roads. In communicating to Goldsborough about his appointment Gideon Welles stated that “more vigorous and energetic action must be taken” to enforce the blockade.

During the summer of 1861 a four-person board, chaired by Captain Samuel F. Du Pont, was formed to study the implementation of the blockade and make recommendations to improve its efficiency. In the board’s report of July 16, 1861, it was recommended that the Atlantic region be divided into northern and southern sectors. On September 18, 1861, the Navy Department reached the decision to implement this division with the dividing line being the border between North Carolina and South Carolina. The implementation of this was delayed for a time and on October 12, 1861, the Navy Department informed Flag Officer Goldsborough that the division of his command would be effective as of the date Flag Officer Samuel F. Du Pont, who was appointed commander of the southern squadron, departed from Hampton Roads with the expedition to capture Port Royal, South Carolina. Du Pont departed on October 29, 1861, upon which date the squadron was divided to form the North Atlantic Blockading Squadron and the South Atlantic Blockading Squadron.

The only major operation conducted by the Atlantic Blockading Squadron was the expedition that led to the capture of Hatteras Inlet, North Carolina August 26–29, 1861. This goal of the operation was to deny use of the inlet to Confederate shipping and this was accomplished with few casualties. The operation was also significant for giving the Union a badly needed victory following the Battle of Bull Run, being the first amphibious landing and the first large scale combined Army-Navy operation of the war.

Ships of the Squadron
On May 17, 1861, there were only fourteen ships assigned to the squadron, along with the Flying Flotilla (later the Potomac Flotilla) which was being formed by Commander James H. Ward who had departed for the Chesapeake from the New York Navy Yard on May 16, 1861. In effect Ward's flotilla acted independently under the direct orders of the Navy Department, though there was some transfer of vessels between the commands. With the acquisition and arming of civilian vessels the Atlantic Blockading Squadron grew to about three times its original allocated strength.

Commanders

References
 In these notes the abbreviation ORN is used for the work Official Records of the Union and Confederate Navies in the War of the Rebellion.
Notes

Bibliography
 Official Records of the Union and Confederate Navies in the War of the Rebellion, Series I, Volume 5. (Washington, DC: Government Printing Office, 1897).
 Official Records of the Union and Confederate Navies in the War of the Rebellion, Series I, Volume 6. (Washington, DC: Government Printing Office, 1897).
 Official Records of the Union and Confederate Navies in the War of the Rebellion, Series I, Volume 12. (Washington, DC: Government Printing Office, 1901).
 Anderson, Bern. By Sea and by River: The Naval History of the Civil War. (New York: Da Capo Press, 1989). 
 Silverstone, Paul H. Warships of the Civil War Navies. (Annapolis, MD: Naval Institute Press, 1989). 

 

Union Navy
Ship squadrons of the United States Navy
1861 establishments in the United States